John Jackson Miller (born January 12, 1968) is an American science-fiction author, comic book writer, and commentator, known for his work on the Star Wars franchise and his research into comic book circulation history, as presented in the Standard Catalog of Comic Books series and the Comichron website.

Early life
Miller attended high school with Nerdist founder and entertainer Chris Hardwick.

Career
A collector of comics and publisher of mini-comics since childhood, Miller began as editor of the trade magazine Comics Retailer in 1993. Following the introduction of Magic: The Gathering, he added games to its coverage, changing the title to Comics & Games Retailer in 2001. In 1998, Miller was appointed managing editor of Comics Buyer's Guide.

His first professional comics work appeared in 2003 in Crimson Dynamo for Marvel Comics, which led to a run on Iron Man (#73/418 – 85/430). He writes a regular column called Longbox Manifesto for regular comics magazine Comics Buyer's Guide. In 2007, he launched Comichron, a website devoted to comic-book circulation history and research. Miller was hired as a writer for the video game Sword of the New World. In early 2008, he launched a fantasy webcomic with artist Chuck Fiala called Sword & Sarcasm.

In 2008, he wrote the Dark Horse comic-book adaptation of Indiana Jones and the Kingdom of the Crystal Skull. In 2009, he was announced as the scripter for Mass Effect: Redemption, the first comic-book series based on the video game Mass Effect, launching in January 2010.

In 2013 he wrote his first novel in a non-licensed universe, Overdraft: The Orion Offensive, for 47North. The work was originally released over several weeks as a Kindle Serial.

Star Wars work
In 2005, Miller wrote a one-shot issue of Star Wars: Empire for Dark Horse Comics, featuring Darth Vader as the main character. Next year, as part of Dark Horse relaunching their Star Wars comic line, Miller started writing the ongoing Star Wars: Knights of the Old Republic comic series,  a spin-off prequel of the video game of the same name. The series proved a major success among fans and lasted for 50 issues, before coming to a conclusion in 2010. In August 2008, Wizards of the Coast released a Knights of the Old Republic guidebook for its Star Wars Roleplaying Game, which Miller co-wrote.

In 2010 Miller began writing the Star Wars: Knight Errant comic series. Following Dark Horse changing the format of their series, it is not ongoing, but instead published as independent story arcs, separated from each other by several months. A Knight Errant novel was released in early 2011 by Del Rey, taking place between the first and second arcs of the comic series – this was Miller's first professional novel.

In October 2012, Del Rey announced that Miller would write Star Wars: Kenobi, a novel about Obi-Wan Kenobi's life on Tatooine. The book was released on August 27, 2013 in hardcover, and debuted at #12 on the New York Times hardcover bestseller list. Miller subsequently wrote Star Wars: A New Dawn, which was published in 2014, a prequel to the animated television series Star Wars Rebels, which premiered on Disney XD in fall the same year. It was the first novel of the new canon that replaced what is now known as Star Wars Legends. Miller also wrote the short story "The Ride", part of the short story collection Canto Bight that was released in December 2017 as part of a marketing program for the movie Star Wars: The Last Jedi.

Partial bibliography
Star Trek: Titan: Absent Enemies (Pocket Books, 2014)
Star Trek: Prey: Hell's Heart (Pocket Books, 2016)
Star Trek: Prey: The Jackal's Trick (Pocket Books, 2016)
Star Trek: Prey: The Hall of Heroes (Pocket Books, 2016)
Star Trek: Discovery: The Enterprise War (Pocket Books, 2019)

References

External links
 
 
 Miller's Star Wars blog
 Comichron
 Standard Catalog of Comic Books
 Scrye magazine
 Interview with John Jackson Miller with The Legion of Dudes about Knights of the Old Republic

1968 births
comics critics
living people
place of birth missing (living people)